Keep It Like a Secret is the fourth studio album released by American indie rock band Built to Spill, and their second for Warner Bros. Records. 

The initial tracks for the album were recorded in November 1997 at Bear Creek Studios in Woodinville, Washington by Phil Ek, with overdubs recorded on mid-1998 at Avast! Recording Co. in Seattle, Washington. Keep It Like a Secret was released on February 2, 1999.  The album spawned two EPs: Carry the Zero and Center of the Universe.

Background
After feeling burned out from constructing the lengthy songs on his previous album, Perfect from Now On, Doug Martsch made a conscious decision to write shorter, more concise songs for Keep It Like a Secret.

Recording 
Many of the songs on the album originated from a week's worth of band jam sessions in Boise. During these marathon jam sessions, which could last up to five hours at a time, Martsch used a foot pedal that triggered a tape machine to begin recording.  He would later comb through the hours of recorded music and find parts that he liked, methodically building them into songs.

The song "You Were Right" features a collage of famous lyrics from songs by The Rolling Stones ("You Can't Always Get What You Want"), The Doors ("The End"), Jimi Hendrix ("Manic Depression"), Bob Dylan ("A Hard Rain's a-Gonna Fall"), Bob Marley ("No Woman, No Cry"), Neil Young ("Don't Be Denied"), John Mellencamp (Jack and Diane"), Kansas ("Dust in the Wind"), Bob Seger ("Against the Wind"), and Pink Floyd ("Another Brick in the Wall"). "You Were Right" almost didn't make the album due to perceived copyright issues.  At the last minute, Warner Bros. Records secured permission for the band to use the lyrics.  In a 1999 interview with The A.V. Club, Martsch described how he wrote the song: "...I came up with the chorus, 'You were wrong when you said, 'Everything's gonna be all right,' and then I decided the verse would be, 'You were right when you said...' something more pessimistic. And then I knew immediately that it was going to be a bunch of clichés, and I decided to use other people's clichés."

Reception

Keep It Like a Secret received mostly positive reviews when it was first released. On Metacritic, the album has a score of 79 out of 100, indicating "generally positive reviews."

Pitchforks Jason Josephes praised the album, writing "at the risk of hopping on a cliché wagon, I think I'm gonna tell all my friends about Built to Spill." In another positive review, AllMusic's Stephen Thomas Erlewine called Keep It Like a Secret "the most immediate and, yes, accessible Built to Spill record," writing that the band "embraced the sounds of a big studio and focused their sound without sacrificing their fractured indie rock aesthetic." Kim Stitzel of MTV called the album "a great (and different) Built to Spill record, proudly displaying its strengths and reveling in its uniqueness even while making concessions to a changing world." Christopher Hess of The Austin Chronicle wrote that Doug Martsch's "guitar vocabulary [...] gives 'Center of the Universe' an intrinsically bright tone, and infuses 'Else' with stunning beauty," while praising Scott Plouf's drumming as being "spot on throughout, providing active punctuation for the multiple layers of guitar." Spins Will Hermes also praised Martsch's guitar playing, writing that "Martsch is still [...] making the most beautiful baroque electric guitar murals in modern rock. Robert Christgau gave the album a two-star honorable mention rating and selected "You Were Right" and "Center of the Universe" as highlights.

Not all contemporary reviews were positive. Trouser Press called Keep It Like a Secret "pure BTS, but without enough sparkle or rough-hewn beauty to be memorable." In another mixed review, Q wrote, "Built to Spill sound as if they're trying too hard, and ultimately both The Flaming Lips and Mercury Rev do this sort of thing with far more panache."

Legacy
In 1999, Pitchfork ranked the album at number 41 on their "Top Albums of the 90s" list. In a retrospective review published in 2013, Kevin McFarland of The A.V. Club called the album "perhaps the best encapsulation of the band's oeuvre and the ever-simmering public response in a single phrase."

Track listing
All songs written by Built to Spill except "Broken Chairs," which includes lyrics by the poet Uhuru Black.

Personnel

Built to Spill 
Doug Martsch – lead vocals, guitar, producer
Brett Nelson – bass
Scott Plouf – drums

Additional musicians 
Sam Coomes – keyboards on "Broken Chairs"
Jim Roth – guitar

Production 
 Phil Ek – producer, engineer
 Steve Fallone – mastering
 Zack Reinig – engineer assistant
 Scott Norton, Juan Garcia – mixing assistant
 Jeff Smith – photography
 Tae Won Yu – design, art direction

External links
 Interview about the making of Keep It Like a Secret

References 

1999 albums
Built to Spill albums
Warner Records albums
Albums produced by Phil Ek
Albums recorded at Bear Creek Studio
Dream pop albums by American artists